Nickerson is a village in Dodge County, Nebraska, United States. The population was 369 at the 2010 census.

History
Nickerson was platted in 1871 when the Fremont, Elkhorn & Missouri Valley Railroad was extended to that point. It was named for its founder, Reynolds K. Nickerson. Nickerson was incorporated as a village in 1910.

Geography
Nickerson is located at  (41.535070, -96.469542).

Demographics

2010 census
As of the census of 2010, there were 369 people, 129 households, and 91 families residing in the village. The racial makeup of the village was 79.7% White, 0.5% African American, 0.3% Native American, 14.9% from other races, and 4.6% from two or more races. Hispanic or Latino of any race were 24.7% of the population.

There were 129 households, of which 37.2% had children under the age of 18 living with them, 48.8% were married couples living together, 16.3% had a female householder with no husband present, 5.4% had a male householder with no wife present, and 29.5% were non-families. 17.8% of all households were made up of individuals, and 9.3% had someone living alone who was 65 years of age or older. The average household size was 2.86 and the average family size was 3.32.

The median age in the village was 33.9 years. 27.1% of residents were under the age of 18; 11.3% were between the ages of 18 and 24; 29.8% were from 25 to 44; 22.3% were from 45 to 64; and 9.5% were 65 years of age or older. The gender makeup of the village was 50.7% male and 49.3% female.

2000 census
As of the census of 2000, there were 431 people, 144 households, and 110 families residing in the village. The population density was 1,131.5 people per square mile (437.9/km). There were 155 housing units at an average density of 406.9 per square mile (157.5/km). The racial makeup of the village was 83.76% White, 0.70% African American, 12.76% from other races, and 2.78% from two or more races. Hispanic or Latino of any race were 22.51% of the population.

There were 144 households, out of which 45.8% had children under the age of 18 living with them, 56.9% were married couples living together, 15.3% had a female householder with no husband present, and 23.6% were non-families. 18.8% of all households were made up of individuals, and 10.4% had someone living alone who was 65 years of age or older. The average household size was 2.99 and the average family size was 3.34.

In the village, the population was spread out, with 34.8% under the age of 18, 9.5% from 18 to 24, 31.8% from 25 to 44, 14.4% from 45 to 64, and 9.5% who were 65 years of age or older. The median age was 28 years. For every 100 females, there were 92.4 males. For every 100 females age 18 and over, there were 86.1 males.

As of 2000 the median income for a household in the village was $36,477, and the median income for a family was $39,688. Males had a median income of $29,531 versus $20,769 for females. The per capita income for the village was $12,744. About 8.7% of families and 12.0% of the population were below the poverty line, including 11.7% of those under age 18 and 8.9% of those age 65 or over.

References

Villages in Dodge County, Nebraska
Villages in Nebraska